MALD or Mald may refer to:

 Master of Arts in Law and Diplomacy, a degree offered by the Fletcher School of Law and Diplomacy
 Miniature Air-Launched Decoy program, a DARPA missile project which produced the ADM-160 MALD
 Andrew Mald, a Papua New Guinean politician